Junior Luamba (born 27 April 2003) is an English professional footballer who plays as a forward for National League side Oldham Athletic.

Playing career
Luamba made his first-team debut for Oldham Athletic on 29 December 2020, starting in a 0–0 draw at Grimsby Town before he was taken off for Davis Keillor-Dunn on 67 minutes. Manager Harry Kewell said that "it was disappointing that he didn't get his goal but he worked very hard and I think he is a special talent".

Statistics

References

2003 births
Living people
English footballers
Black British sportspeople
Association football forwards
Oldham Athletic A.F.C. players
English Football League players